Valerie Hanicque (born 16 February 1964, at Cambrai) is a former French athlete, who specialised in the shot put and  the discus throw.

She won the French national title in the shot put (15.84 m) and the discus (55.22 m) at the 1988 French Athletics Championships .

Selected eleven times for France national athletic teams, her personal best is 16.68 m in the Shot Put (1989) 57.56 m in the discus (1989) and 47.40 meters in the hammer throw.

External links 
 DocAthlé2003, p 408, French Athletics Federation 2003

1964 births
Living people
French female discus throwers
French female shot putters
French female hammer throwers
20th-century French women